Sir Giles Frederick Squire, KBE, CIE (12 October 1894 - 11 April 1959) was a British colonial civil servant and diplomat. He was British Envoy to Afghanistan from 1943 to 1948 and Ambassador from 1948 to 1949.

References

Ambassadors of the United Kingdom to Afghanistan
1894 births
1959 deaths
People educated at Marlborough College
Alumni of Christ Church, Oxford
Gloucestershire Regiment officers
British Army personnel of World War I
Indian Civil Service (British India) officers